Ian Mathers  (7 September 1930 – 16 January 2020) was an Australian rules footballer who played with Hawthorn in the Victorian Football League (VFL) and a big name in the Australian Brass Band community. One of the founders of the Victorian State Youth Band he has an award named after him in the Australian National Brass Band Championships and in 1981 he was awarded a British Empire Medal for services to brass banding in Australia.

Notes

External links 

1930 births
Australian rules footballers from Victoria (Australia)
Hawthorn Football Club players
2020 deaths
Australian recipients of the British Empire Medal